The history of the cinema of Morocco dates back to "The Moroccan Goatherd" by Louis Lumière in 1897. During the French protectorate, films were produced and directed by French filmmakers, and in 1952, Orson Welles directed his Othello in the historic city of Essaouira. Since independence in 1956, Moroccan film directors and producers have produced a growing number of films, some of which have been met with growing international success.

History
Cinema in Morocco has a long history, stretching back over a century to the filming of Le chèvrier Marocain ("The Moroccan Goatherd") by Louis Lumière in 1897. Between that time and 1944, many foreign movies were shot in the country, especially in the Ouarzazate area.

In the first half of the 20th century, Casablanca had many movie theaters, such as Cinema Rialto, Cinema Lynx and Cinema Vox—the largest in Africa at the time it was built.

Salut Casa! (1952) was a propaganda film brandishing France's purported colonial triumph in its civilizing mission in the city.

In 1944, the Moroccan Cinematographic Center (CCM), the nation's film regulatory body, was established. Studios were also opened in Rabat.

In 1952, Orson Welles' Othello won the Palme d'Or at the Cannes Film Festival under the Moroccan flag. However, the festival's musicians did not play the Moroccan national anthem, as no one in attendance, knew what it was. Six years later, Mohammed Ousfour would create the first Moroccan movie, Le fils maudit ("The Damned Son").

In 1968, the first Mediterranean Film Festival of Morocco was held in Tangier. In its current editions, the event is held in Tetouan. This festival was followed in 1982 with the first national festival of cinema, which was held in Rabat. In 2001, the International Film Festival of Marrakech (FIFM) started its yearly festival in Marrakech.

Mostafa Derkaoui's 1973 film About Some Meaningless Events was screened twice in Morocco before it was banned under Hassan II.

Love in Casablanca (1991), starring Abdelkrim Derkaoui and Muna Fettou, was one of the first Moroccan films to deal with Morocco's complex realities and depict life in Casablanca with verisimilitude. Bouchra Ijork's 2007 made-for-TV film Bitter Orange achieved wide support among Moroccan viewers. Nour-Eddine Lakhmari's Casanegra (2008) depicts the harsh realities of Casablanca's working classes. The films Ali Zaoua (2000), Horses of God (2012), Much Loved (2015), and Ghazzia (2017) of Nabil Ayouch—a French director of Moroccan heritage—deal with street crime, terrorism, and social issues in Casablanca, respectively. The events in Meryem Benm'Barek-Aloïsi's 2018 film Sofia revolve around an illegitimate pregnancy in Casablanca. Hicham Lasri and Said Naciri also from Casablanca.

In 2021 Casablanca Beats became the first Moroccan film to be selected to compete for the Palme d'Or since 1962.

Atlas Studios in Warzazat is a large movie studio.

The Marrakech International Film Festival was first held in 2001.

In his book La septième porte (The Seventh Door), the poet, novelist and filmmaker Ahmed Bouanani (1938-2011) retraces 24 years of Moroccan film history. As described by literary critic and publisher Kenza Sefrioui, who edited Bouanani's personal history of cinema in Morocco, the author "recounts scenarios, he details the atmosphere of the scenes, he attests to reception, and he presents himself as an often ironic, sometimes humorous commentator, in dialogue with his reader."

Film industry in Morocco

Directors
Morocco has known a first generation of directors in the 70s-90s. They participated to the development of film industry in Morocco. Notable film makers are Hamid Bénani (Wechma, Traces, 1970), Souheil Ben Barka (Les Mille et une Mains, 1974), Moumen Smihi (El Chergui ou le Silence violent, 1975), Ahmed El Maânouni (Alyam, Alyam, 1978 ; Transes (Al Hal), 1981; Les Cœurs brûlés, 2007), Jilali Ferhati (Poupées de roseau, 1981; La Plage des enfants perdus, 1991), Mustapha Derkaoui (Les Beaux Jours de Shéhérazade, 1982) ; Farida Benlyazd (Une porte sur le ciel, 1988), Saâd Chraïbi (Chronique d'une vie normale, 1990), Mohamed Abderrahmane Tazi (Badis, 1989 ; À la recherche du mari de ma femme, 1993), Abdelkader Lagtaâ (Un amour à Casablanca, 1992 ; La Porte close, 1998), Hakim Noury (Le Marteau et l'Enclume, 1990), Hassan Benjelloun (La Fête des autres, 1990)

Since roughly the year 2000, a  younger generation of Moroccan filmmakers has been taking over. Some of its prominent names are:
Nabil Ayouch
Hisham Lasri
Narjiss Nejjar
Faouzi Bensaïdi
Nour-Eddine Lakhmari
Doha Moustaquim
Laïla Marrakchi (her first	full-length feature film, Marock, produced in 2004 was nominated at the Festival de Cannes 2005 in the category "Un certain regard").

Festivals
International Film Festival of Marrakech
 Mediterranean Film Festival

Comedians

Living in Morocco

Living abroad (mainly in France)

National structure

Union and professional organizations
The Moroccan Cinematographic Centre (Centre cinématographique marocain) is a public institution under the Ministry of Culture for the promotion, distribution and projection of movies in Morocco. Most other organisations related to films and cinemas are grouped into business chambers or trade unions, for example the National Federation of Film Clubs or the National Chamber of Film Producers.

Film studios
studios ATLAS (Ouarzazate)
studios KAN ZAMANE
studios CINEDINA (Soualem)
studios ESTER ANDROMEDA
CLA Studios (Ouarzazate)
studios CINECITTA (Ouarzazate)

Institutes for film and audiovisual studies
The Superior School of Visual Arts of Marrakech (ESAVM)
Institut spécialisé dans le métiers du cinéma (ISMC) Ouarzazate
Institut spécialisé du cinéma et de l'audiovisuel (ISCA) de Rabat
Institut supérieur des métiers de l'audiovisuel et du cinéma (ISMAC)

See also

 Arab cinema
 Egyptian cinema
 List of Moroccan films
 List of foreign movies shot in Morocco
 Culture of Morocco
 Cinema of the world

References

Further reading
 Ahmed Bouanani, La septième porte. Une histoire du cinéma au Maroc de 1907 à 1986. Kulte Editions, 2021, 336 p. (in French) 
 Kevin Dwyer, "Morocco: A National Cinema with Large Ambitions" in: Josef Gugler (ed.) Film in the Middle East and North Africa: Creative Dissidence, University of Texas Press and American University in Cairo Press, 2011, pp 325-348

External links
Moroccan Cinema Cinema portal in Morocco
CineMa Cinema
 JAWHARA, prison girl, by Saad Chraïbi, in Babelmed.net